"Groove with It" is the first single released from Big Daddy Kane's fourth studio album, Prince of Darkness.

Though Prince of Darkness was both a critical and commercial disappointment, "Groove with It" became the second highest charting single of Kane's career, peaking at number two on the Billboard Hot Rap Singles chart, behind only "Smooth Operator", which made it to number one on the rap charts.

Single track listing
"Groove with It" (Album Version) – 5:04
"Groove with It" (Instrumental) – 4:59

Chart history

1991 singles
Big Daddy Kane songs
1991 songs
Warner Records singles
Songs written by Big Daddy Kane
Cold Chillin' Records singles